Pterostylis psammophila, commonly known as the two-bristle greenhood, is a plant in the orchid family Orchidaceae and is endemic to South Australia. Both flowering and non-flowering plants have a rosette of leaves and flowering plants have translucent green and white flowers with an insect-like labellum, but the flowers are only open for a few days.

Description
Pterostylis psammophila is a terrestrial,  perennial, deciduous, herb with an underground tuber and a rosette of between six and sixteen overlapping leaves. Flowering plants have a rosette at the base of the flowering stem but the leaves are usually withered by flowering time. The dorsal sepal and petals form a hood or "galea" over the column, the lateral sepals turn downwards and the labellum is insect-like with two long bristles on the "head" end. Flowering occurs between late August and October.

Taxonomy and naming
The two-bristle greenhood was first formally described in 2007 by D.L.Jones who gave it the name Oligochaeochilus psammophilus. The description was published in The Orchadian from a specimen collected near Cockatoo Valley. In 2008, Robert Bates changed the name to Pterostylis psammophila. The specific epithet (psammophila) is derived from the Ancient Greek ψάμμος (psámmos), meaning “sand” and φίλος (phílos), meaning “dear one" or "friend”.

Distribution
Pterostylis psammophila is only known from two populations near Lyndoch.

Conservation
Pterostylis psammophila  is classified as "critically endangered" Environment Protection and Biodiversity Conservation Act 1999 (EPBC Act). The species is threatened by illegal collection, weed invasion and grazing by livestock and rabbits.

References

psammophila
Endemic orchids of Australia
Orchids of South Australia
Plants described in 2007